The 2007–08 season was PAOK Football Club’s 82nd in existence and the club’s 49th consecutive season in the top flight of Greek football. The team entered the Greek Football Cup in the fourth round.

Players

Squad

Transfers

Players transferred in

Players transferred out

1 On 18 June 2007 become president.
2 On 6 January 2008, Vryzas played his last game. On 8 January 2008, Vryzas was officially appointed as the Technical Director of PAOK FC. He joined the club's board along with former teammate and current chairman of the club, Theodoros Zagorakis.

Kit

Competitions

Overview

Managerial statistics

Super League Greece

League table

Results summary

Results by round

Matches

Greek Football Cup

Fourth round

Statistics

Squad statistics

! colspan="13" style="background:#DCDCDC; text-align:center" | Goalkeepers
|-

! colspan="13" style="background:#DCDCDC; text-align:center" | Defenders
|-

! colspan="13" style="background:#DCDCDC; text-align:center" | Midfielders
|-

! colspan="13" style="background:#DCDCDC; text-align:center" | Forwards
|-

|}

Goalscorers

Disciplinary record

External links
 PAOK FC official website

PAOK FC seasons
PAOK